Tamir Blatt (born May 4, 1997) is an Israeli professional basketball player for Alba Berlin of the German Basketball Bundesliga. He is the son of former basketball player and coach David Blatt. In 2020-21 he led the Israel Basketball Premier League in assists per game.

Early life
Blatt was born in Netanya, Israel.  He is the son of former basketball player and coach David Blatt. He played for Hapoel Lev Hasharon youth team, where led his team to win the state cup in 2021, alongside his teammate Roi Huber. In July 2021, Blatt joined the Wingate Institute youth academy.

Professional career

Hapoel Tel Aviv (2014–2017)
On August 27, 2014, Blatt started his professional career with Hapoel Tel Aviv, signing a four-year deal. In his first season with Hapoel, Blatt was loaned to A.S. Ramat HaSharon of the Israeli National League, where he averaged 9.7 points, 4.1 assists and 2.5 rebounds per game.

In his third season with Hapoel, Blatt made a breakthrough season averaging 7.4 points, 5.4 assists and 2.2 rebounds per game, earning a spot in Hapoel's starting lineup. On April 18, 2017, Blatt participated in the 2017 Israeli League All-Star Game.

Hapoel Holon (2017–2018)
On July 13, 2017, Blatt signed a two-year contract with Hapoel Holon. On November 12, 2017, Blatt recorded a career-high 22 points, shooting 6-of-10 from three-point range, along with five rebounds and five assists in a 104–74 blowout win over Maccabi Rishon LeZion. On December 5, 2017, Blatt recorded a double-double with a career-high 13 assists and 12 points in a 94–90 win over EWE Baskets Oldenburg. He was subsequently made the Champions League Team of the Week.

Blatt helped Holon to win the 2018 Israeli State Cup, as well as reaching the 2018 Israeli League Final. In 54 games played during the 2017–18 season (played in the Israeli League and the Champions League), he averaged 6.4 points and 4.6 assists per game.

Hapoel Jerusalem (2018–2021)
On July 4, 2018, Blatt signed a two-year deal with Hapoel Jerusalem, joining his former head coach Oded Kattash. On December 26, 2018, Blatt recorded a season-high 21 points, shooting 6-of-13 from the field in a 94–74 win over his former team Hapoel Holon. On May 4, 2019, Blatt was named the Champions League Best Young Player.

In 2020-21 he led the Israel Basketball Premier League in assists per game (7.9).

Alba Berlin (2021–present)
On July 8, 2021, he has signed with Alba Berlin of the German Basketball Bundesliga.

National team career

Israeli junior national team
Blatt was a member of the U-16, U-18 and U-20 Israel national teams.

In July 2015, Blatt helped the Israeli under-18 national team to reach the 2015 FIBA Europe Under-18 Championship Division B Final, where they eventually lost to Sweden and earned a silver medal. Blatt averaged 9.4 points, 4.1 rebounds and 4.8 assists per game.

On September 18, 2015, Blatt participated in the FIBA European U-18 All-Star Game in France, recording six points and six assists.

In July 2017, Blatt led the Israeli under-20 national team to reach the 2017 FIBA Europe Under-20 Championship Final, where they eventually lost to Greece. Blatt set FIBA U20 all-time record in assists per game with 10.1 and also averaged 16 points, 4.6 rebounds and 1.3 steals per game. Blatt earned a spot in the All-Tournament Team.

Israeli senior national team
Blatt is a member of the Israel national basketball team. On November 24, 2017, he made his first appearance for the senior team at the 2019 FIBA Basketball World Cup qualification match against Estonia, recording nine points and three assists off the bench.

Personal life
Blatt's father, David, is a former professional basketball player and head coach. His cousin, Golan Gutt, is a current professional basketball player for Ironi Nes Ziona.

References

External links
 RealGM profile
 FIBA profile

1997 births
Living people
Alba Berlin players
Hapoel Holon players
Hapoel Jerusalem B.C. players
Hapoel Tel Aviv B.C. players
Israeli men's basketball players
Israeli people of American-Jewish descent
People from Netanya
Point guards